Krzyżowniki  is a village in the administrative district of Gmina Kleszczewo, within Poznań County, Greater Poland Voivodeship, in west-central Poland.

References 

Villages in Poznań County